Ángel Francisco Férez Crespo (born 20 January 1966) is a Spanish retired footballer who played as a goalkeeper.

Playing career
Born in Seville, Andalusia, Férez finished his formation with Real Madrid, being promoted to the reserves in the 1985 summer. He made his debut as a professional on 2 November 1986, starting in a 0–3 away loss against Recreativo de Huelva in the Segunda División.

Subsequently, Férez moved to neighbouring Rayo Vallecano, also of the second level, earning promotion in his second season but being relegated in his third. With his following club, CP Mérida, he appeared initially as a first choice but was subsequently overtook by Francisco Leal.

In the 1994 summer Férez joined Cádiz CF of the Segunda División B, retiring in 1999 at the age of 33.

Post-playing career
Shortly after retiring, Férez started working as a goalkeeping coach with his last team. In 2005, he was included in Luis Aragonés' staff at the Spanish national team, and also worked with the manager during his spell at Fenerbahçe SK.

On 5 July 2009 Férez returned to his native country, joining UD Almería.

References

External links

Stats and bio at Cadistas1910 

1966 births
Living people
Footballers from Seville
Spanish footballers
Association football goalkeepers
La Liga players
Segunda División players
Segunda División B players
Real Madrid Castilla footballers
Rayo Vallecano players
CP Mérida footballers
Cádiz CF players